Aponotoreas villosa is a moth of the family Geometridae. It is endemic to New Zealand.

Taxonomy

This species was first described by Alfred Philpott as Notoreas villosa in 1917. In 1986 R. C. Craw described the new genus Aponotoreas and included A. villosa within it.

Distribution 

The male of this species was first collected in 1910 at The Hump, near Waiau and the female of the species was discovered in 1915 by C. C. Fenwick in the same locality.   A. villosa has also been found in the Hunter Mountains.

Habitat 

A. villosa inhabits grassland areas up to 1200 metres in altitude.

Life cycle

Adult moths are normally seen between December and February.

References

External links

 Citizen science observations of species
 Specimens held at the Auckland War Memorial Museum

Moths of New Zealand
Hydriomenini
Moths described in 1917
Endemic fauna of New Zealand
Endemic moths of New Zealand